The 2019 New York Yankees season was the 117th season in New York City for the Yankees, and the 119th season overall for the franchise. The Yankees play in Yankee Stadium in the city's northern borough of The Bronx, and are led by Aaron Boone on his second season as team manager. After a 9–1 victory over the Angels at home on September 19, the Yankees clinched the American League East Division for the first time since the 2012 season. They opened the playoffs by defeating and sweeping the Minnesota Twins in the Division Series, but were eliminated in the American League Championship Series by the Houston Astros in six games. This marked the first calendar decade since the 1910s that the team failed to make a single World Series appearance. In addition, with the Mets losing in the 2015 World Series, the 2010s decade was the first calendar decade since the 1910s that a New York City team failed to win a World Series.

The Yankees set a new MLB record by homering in 139 of their regular season games, surpassing the previous best held jointly by the 2012 and 2018 Yankees. Despite the Yankees competing with the Astros and Dodgers for the best record in baseball the majority of the season, they went 1–4 in their final 5 games, and finished 4 and 3 games behind both teams, respectively.

Offseason

Transactions

2018
 October 31 – Brett Gardner re-signs with the Yankees after his club option in his previous contract was denied. His new contract is a one-year, $9.5 million deal.
 November 7 – CC Sabathia re-signs for his final season with the Yankees, inking a one-year, $8 million deal.
 November 19 – The Yankees trade minor league prospects Justus Sheffield, Erik Swanson and Dom Thompson-Williams to the Seattle Mariners for LHP James Paxton.
 December 17 – J. A. Happ signs a two-year, $34 million contract with the Yankees. This deal goes through the 2020 season and includes a vesting option for 2021.

2019
 January 3 – Troy Tulowitzki signs the league-minimum one-year, $555,000 contract with the Yankees. He will still receive $38 million over two years from the Toronto Blue Jays due to his conditional release on December 11, 2018.
 January 11 – Zack Britton signs a three-year, $39 million contract with the Yankees. The deal goes through 2021 and has a team option for 2022, which is worth $14 million. Britton can opt-out of the contract after 2020 if the Yankees choose not to exercise the 2022 option.
 January 14 – DJ LeMahieu signs a two-year, $24 million contract with the Yankees. He is expected to be used at shortstop and third base as well as second base, his natural position.
 January 21 – The Yankees trade RHP Sonny Gray and LHP Reiver Sanmartin to the Cincinnati Reds for minor league 2B Shed Long and a competitive balance pick in the 2019 MLB Draft. Long was then traded to the Seattle Mariners for minor league OF Josh Stowers.
 January 24 – Adam Ottavino signs a three-year, $27 million contract with the Yankees. He is the first person in franchise history to wear the uniform number 0.
 February 15 – Luis Severino signs a four-year contract extension, avoiding salary arbitration. The deal includes a club option for the 2023 season. He is guaranteed $40 million and will make an additional $12.25 million if the option is exercised.
 February 25 – Aaron Hicks signs a seven-year, $70 million contract extension with a $12.5 million club option for 2026, a $1 million buyout and a $2 million signing bonus. This deal replaces the previous one-year, $6 million deal announced on January 11.

Spring training
The Yankees began their spring training on February 13, when pitchers and catchers reported. Their first spring training game was against the Boston Red Sox on February 23, in which they lost 5–8. They ended spring training with an exhibition game against the Washington Nationals at Nationals Park on March 25 in which they lost 3–5. Overall, they went 17–10–4, good for first place in the Grapefruit League.

Transactions
 March 19 – Gio González signs a minor league deal with the Yankees. If the Yankees had added González to their active roster, the contract would've been worth $3 million for the season.

Injuries
 March 1 – Aaron Hicks injures his back during a spring training game. He is expected to start the season on the injured list.
 March 15 – Luis Severino was diagnosed with rotator cuff inflammation. He is expected to miss all of April, allowing Masahiro Tanaka to start on Opening Day in his place.
 March 19 – Dellin Betances was diagnosed with right shoulder impingement after seeing a concerning dip in velocity all of spring training. He will start the year on the injured list.

Regular season

Key dates
 March 28: Opening Day vs. Baltimore Orioles
 June 29–30: 2019 MLB London Series vs. Boston Red Sox
 July 8–11: All-Star Break
July 9: All-Star Game at Progressive Field in Cleveland, Ohio
 September 22: Final regular season game at home vs. Toronto Blue Jays
 September 29: Final regular season game vs. Texas Rangers at Globe Life Park in Arlington

Opening Day
The Yankees began the regular season against the Baltimore Orioles at Yankee Stadium on March 28, in which the Yankees won 7–2. Masahiro Tanaka pitched  innings and allowed 6 hits and 2 runs while striking out 5 in his first opening day victory.

Opening Day lineup

Line score

March/April
March 28–31, vs. Baltimore Orioles
After winning the season opener 7–2, the Yankees went on to lose the next two games against division rivals Orioles. In the second game of the season, offseason signing James Paxton's debut on the mound ended with a 5–3 loss. Errors and a poor start by the Yankees offense cost them the game. The Yanks didn't bounce back the following day, in a game that was delayed more than 3 hours because of rain. J. A. Happ took his first loss at the Yankee Stadium since August 2013 as the offense failed to capitalize on numerous run opportunities. New York lost their second game in a row, 7–5, as well as the opening series against the O's. Over the two final games, the Yankees went 5 for 21 with runners in scoring position, stranding 25 men on base.

Yankees lost the series 1–2 (15–14 runs)

April 1–3, vs. Detroit Tigers
The Yankees started their second season series with a 3–1 win against Detroit. Shortly before the game started, the team added their star outfielder Giancarlo Stanton and third baseman Miguel Andújar to an already filled up injury list. Andújar was diagnosed with a torn labrum, which could need surgery in the following weeks. The remaining Yankees defeated the Tigers, majorly thanks to a stellar diving catch by Aaron Judge in the eighth inning, when they were in jeopardy of losing their shy lead. Tigers manager Ron Gardenhire said the play was the turning point of the game. The pinstripes fared less well in the remaining two games, losing them both by a narrow score. On April 2, with the game tied at 1 in the top of the ninth inning,  Dustin Peterson's double gave the Tigers the lead against the Yankees closer Aroldis Chapman, in what was the first hit of his career. Detroit went on to win that one 3–1. In the final game of the series, the Yankees lost 2–1 to a dominating performance by left-handed pitcher Matthew Boyd, who struck out a career-high 13 batters in  innings.

Yankees lost the series 1–2 (5–6 runs)

April 4–7, at Baltimore Orioles
New York swept the Orioles at Camden Yards in their second meeting of the season, delivering a total of 14 home runs—seven of which in the last game alone. The Yankees had a rough start of the first game, but were rescued by Gleyber Torres to produce an 8–4 victory. Trailing by a score of 3–0, Torres homered a ball into the left field to get the Yankees in the scoreboard. Later on, trailing by 4–2 and with two men on base, Torres homered again to take the lead. In the second game of the series the Yankees won 6–4, as Aaron Judge homered twice and Clint Frazier hit a three-run homer to retake the lead. The Yanks claimed the series sweep in a 15–3 blowout, once again steampowered by home runs. Gary Sánchez homered thrice and had the opportunity for a fourth home run, a rare feat only accomplished by eighteen players in MLB to date.

Yankees won the series 3–0 (29–11 runs)

April 8–10, at Houston Astros
The Yankees got swept by the Astros at Minute Maid Park for the first time in history. Despite getting on the scoreboard first in all three games of the series, New York got punished by some mistakes in the field and subpar pitching. In the 8th inning of game 1, Carlos Correa hit off Adam Ottavino, who had not allowed a run yet in the season, to give Houston what would be the definitive lead, 4–3. The next day, the Yankees announced pitcher Luis Severino had strained a right latissimus dorsi muscle and would not return to the mound until about late June, another addition to the Yanks million-dollar worth injured list. Onto that day's game, a mistake by Brett Gardner in the third inning, who stopped running to first base assuming the ball had been foul, allowed a double play by the Astros. Moreover, Clint Frazier missed multiple diving catches, and relief pitcher Chad Green allowed a two-run double to George Springer in the eight inning. The Yanks lost that one 6–3 after being ahead twice. Finally, the Yankees could not avoid the sweep in an 8–6 loss where a late rally by New York fell short. Having cut the deficit from 2–7 to 6–7 in the top of the eighth, a bad throw by Gleyber Torres fostered an Astros run to seal the game and the series.

Yankees lost the series 0–3 (12–18 runs)

April 12–14, vs. Chicago White Sox
Back at Yankee Stadium, New York lost yet another series, to the White Sox. Prior to the first game, Gary Sánchez became the 12th player on the Yankees injured list, the most of any team in the major leagues. Later, a rain-shortened 9–6 loss became the Yankees' fourth in a row, and J. A. Happ's second of the season, who allowed nine hits and six runs in just 4 innings pitched. Eloy Jiménez, one of the top prospects in baseball, threw his first two career home runs to give Chicago the game, declared official after the top seventh. New York bounced back in the second game of the series with a 4–0 win. CC Sabathia returned after recovery from heart surgery and debuted at the mound in his 19th and final season. He allowed a single hit in five innings and kept the White Sox off the scoreboard. However, Chicago claimed the series on the following day with a 5–2 win over the Yankees. Tim Anderson scored the first grand slam of his career when the White Sox were trailing by 2 to take the lead, and they never gave up on it.

Yankees lost the series 1–2 (12–14 runs)

April 16–17, vs. Boston Red Sox
In their first meeting of the season, the Yankees swept their longtime rivals and reigning World Series champions in a two-game series. One day before the series started, the pinstripes added another player to the injured list, first baseman Greg Bird. The first game was an 8–0 shutout by the Yankees, with a dominating James Paxton who struck out 12 Red Sox batters and allowed only two hits over eight innings. Meanwhile, Boston ace pitcher Chris Sale allowed seven hits and four runs in five innings and collected his fourth loss of the season. The second game was closer, and an early 3–0 lead by the Red Sox menaced with evening the series. However, a Brett Gardner go-ahead grand slam in the bottom seventh, which was his 100th career home run, gave the Yanks the definitive lead, 5–3. Tommy Kahnle was credited with his first win of the season and Aroldis Chapman made his third save.

Yankees won the series 2–0 (13–3 runs)

April 18–21, vs. Kansas City Royals
The Yankees won the four-game series against Kansas City to reclaim an over .500 winning percentage, although star outfielder Aaron Judge got injured in the third game.

Yankees won the series 3–1 (23–16 runs)

April 22–25, at Los Angeles Angels
The Yankees started their road trip to the West Coast at Angel Stadium, where they won their third series in a row.

Yankees won the series 3–1 (22–24 runs)

April 26–28, at San Francisco Giants
New York got the sweep against San Francisco in a three-game series at Oracle Park.

Yankees won the series 3–0 (24–12 runs)

April 30 – May 1, at Arizona Diamondbacks
The Diamondbacks swept the Yankees in a two-game series at their home stadium. CC Sabathia became the 17th pitcher to collect 3,000 or more strikeouts in a career in the first game.

Yankees lost the series 0–2 (3–6 runs)

May
May 3–5, vs. Minnesota Twins
Back in The Bronx, the Yankees won two out of three games in a series against the Minnesota Twins.

Yankees won the series 2–1 (13–10 runs)

May 6–9, vs. Seattle Mariners
New York got their seventh series win of the season, and second in a row, against the Mariners.

Yankees won the series 3–1 (16–18 runs)

May 10–12, at Tampa Bay Rays
The Yankees went to Tropicana Field with the opportunity to claim division leadership by sweeping the Rays, which were leading the AL East themselves. Although the Yanks did not get the sweep, they moved up to half a game behind Tampa Bay with the series win.

Yankees won the series 2–1 (13–11 runs)

May 13–15, vs. Baltimore Orioles
The games against the Orioles intended for May 13 and May 14 got both postponed, one of them to May 15 and the other to August 12th, due to inclement weather. Therefore, the series itself consisted of a doubleheader on May 15, the first in the season for the Yankees, who claimed the sweep over the O's.

Yankees won the series 2–0 (8–4 runs)

May 17–19, vs. Tampa Bay Rays
With AL East up for grabs, the Rays went to the Bronx to play a three-game series against the Yankees. The pinstripes won the series 2–1 to claim a half-game lead over Tampa Bay.

Yankees won the series 2–1 (18–10 runs)

May 20–23, at Baltimore Orioles
The Yankees and the Orioles met at Camden Yards for their fourth series of the season, with New York sweeping Baltimore for the third time.

Yankees won the series 4–0 (34–21 runs)
 
May 24–26, at Kansas City Royals
The Yankees won a three-game series against the Royals at Kauffman Stadium. The first game had to be postponed due to inclement weather, resulting in a doubleheader on May 25.

Yankees won the series 2–1 (20–16 runs)

May 27–29, vs. San Diego Padres
The Yankees returned to New York and added two wins and a loss against the Padres. Chad Green opened the series by pitching a single inning, striking out three batters before yielding to David Hale. Hale pitched for four innings and allowed two runs, and was relieved by Adam Ottavino in the sixth, Tommy Kahnle in the seventh, Zack Britton in the eighth, and Aroldis Chapman got his 15th save of the season in the ninth. Home runs by Clint Frazier, Brett Gardner and Gary Sánchez steampowered a 5–2 Yankees win, improving to a 3–0 record with Green as a starter. In the second game, Eric Hosmer hit an early three-run homer against Masahiro Tanaka, who took his fourth loss of the season. After a solid performance by Eric Lauer, allowing four hits and one run over  innings, the Padres delved through their bullpen to hold off the Yankees, 5–4. On the following day, New York cruised to a 7–0 shutout to claim their eighth series in a row. For the 10th time in franchise history, the Yankees opened the game with back-to-back homers. James Paxton returned to the mound after his injury and pitched four hitless innings.

Yankees won the series 2–1 (16–7 runs)

May 30 – June 2, vs. Boston Red Sox
The Yankees faced their longtime rivals for the second time in the season. The first game of the series was postponed to August 3, resulting in a three-game series. In the series opener, the Red Sox got onto the scoreboard first, but DJ LeMahieu later delivered an RBI double and a home run off Chris Sale to secure a 4–1 Yankees win. New York dominated from the mound that day, with starter J. A. Happ limiting the Sox to a single homer over five innings and closer Aroldis Chapman striking out two of three men to earn his 16th save of the season. On the next day, with the score tied at 3 in the bottom fifth, Gary Sánchez hit a two-run homer to get the lead, which was locked down by six Yankees relief pitchers throwing a combined  scoreless innings. With the 5–3 victory over the Red Sox, the pinstripes went 4–0 against their rivals for the first time since 2012 and claimed their ninth series in a row for the first time since 1998. The Yankees could not complete the sweep in the last game, mostly because of a couple mistakes by Clint Frazier and strong pitching by David Price. A late rally by New York fell short and they got their first defeat of the season against the Sox, 8–5.

Yankees won the series 2–1 (14–12 runs)

June
June 4–6, at Toronto Blue Jays
The Yankees crossed the border to face the Blue Jays at Rogers Centre, and lost their first series since early May.

Yankees lost the series 1–2 (16–17 runs)

June 7–9, at Cleveland Indians
The Yankees could not hold on in a three-game series against the Indians at Cleveland.

Yankees lost the series 1–2 (13–19 runs)

June 10–11, vs. New York Mets
The Yankees and the Mets split the first Subway Series of the season, which consisted of a doubleheader on June 11 because of the first game being postponed.

Yankes tied the series 1–1 (16–15 runs)

June 13–16, at Chicago White Sox
The pinstripes took on the four-game series against the White Sox at Guaranteed Rate Field, coming back from an 0–2 deficit to split the series.

Yankees tied the series 2–2 (24–22 runs)

June 17–19, vs. Tampa Bay Rays
The Yankees went back to winning ways by sweeping the Rays, cementing a -game lead at the top of AL East. In the series opener, a dominant Masahiro Tanaka pitched his seventh complete game in the Major League, allowing only two hits and striking 10 batters in a 3–0 shutout. Recently acquired DH Edwin Encarnación made his debut for the Yankees in the first game of the series, in which he went 0 for 4. On the next day, the Yankees won 6–3 in Giancarlo Stanton's return to the lineup, after more than two months on the IL. Cameron Maybin homered for his fourth consecutive game and Encarnación joined him with his first home run for the Bombers, as J. A. Happ improved to a 6–0 record in his last eight starts (7–3 overall). The Yankees completed the sweep on the day CC Sabathia collected his 250th win in the major league, becoming the 14th pitcher in major league history to both record 3,000 strikeouts and 250 wins. New York's offense contributed with two six-run explosive first and seventh innings, which added up to a 12–1 blowout, capped by Gleyber Torres' first career grand slam.

Yankees won the series 3–0 (21–4 runs)
 
June 20–23, vs. Houston Astros
The New York Yankees faced the Astros in a four-game series at home, winning three of them while breaking multiple team records.

Yankees won the series 3–1 (25–21 runs)

June 24–26, vs. Toronto Blue Jays
The Yankees swept the Blue Jays in a three-game series at the Bronx. On June 24, during the first game of the series, the Yankees tied an MLB record with the 2002 Texas Rangers for the most consecutive games with at least one home run, at 27. On June 25, the Yankees became the first team in MLB history to hit a home run in 28 straight games.

Yankees won the series 3–0 (22–18 runs)

2019 MLB London Series

On June 29–30, the New York Yankees and the Boston Red Sox played a two-game series at London Stadium, in London. In the first MLB games ever played in Europe, the Yankees swept their longtime divisional rivals, 17–13 and 12–8, while posting some significant records. The Red Sox were the designated home team for both games, although the Yankees also wore their home jerseys in order to appear in their well-known pinstripes, despite being the visiting team. Both teams were allowed to have 26 active players on their rosters during the series (one more than MLB normally allows), with the extra man being a position player, as well as 28 players travel to London, in case a roster move (such as due to injury) was required between games.

Yankees won the series 2–0 (29–21 runs)

July
July 2–3, at New York Mets
Back across the Atlantic Ocean, the Yankees faced the Mets at Citi Field for the second Subway Series of the season—like the first one, the series was a split. In the first game, the Yankees streak of consecutive games with a home run came to an end at 31.

Yankees tied the series 1–1 (7–5 runs)

July 4–7, at Tampa Bay Rays
Right before the All-Star break, the pinstripes played a four-game series at Tropicana Field against Tampa Bay. Despite the Yanks taking a 2–0 lead with two similar 8–4 wins which went into extra innings, the Rays recovered to split the series.

Yankees tied the series 2–2 (20–14 runs)

All-Star break
The 90th Major League Baseball All-Star Game, which ended in a 4–3 win for the American League, had a big presence of pinstripes. Second baseman DJ LeMahieu and catcher Gary Sánchez were both on the AL starting lineup, Masahiro Tanaka was the winning pitcher, and Aroldis Chapman made the save. CC Sabathia threw the ceremonial first pitch.

July 12–14, vs. Toronto Blue Jays
The Yankees began the second half of the season with a ten-game homestand. In a three-game series against the Blue Jays, two out of three low scoring affairs went New York's way.

Yankees won the series 2–1 (9–4 runs)

July 15–18, vs. Tampa Bay Rays
The Yankees and the Rays met at Yankee Stadium for the last time in the 2019 season, leaving just two games to play at Tampa Bay later in the season. The Yanks claimed the series and finished 8 games ahead of the Rays. The Yankees started the series with a 5–4 loss, as Aroldis Chapman blew the save and allowed a three-run homer with two outs in the top of the ninth. Travis d'Arnaud hit three home runs, including the go ahead one, and became the first catcher to do so against the Yankees. The pinstripes bounced back the next day with an 8–3 win. In the bottom eighth, with the Yankees trailing 3–2, an Aaron Judge two-run homer sparked a rally to even the series, capped by Didi Gregorius' fourth career grand slam. Winning pitcher David Hale kept the game close in the seventh, inducing d'Arnaud into an inning-ending double play with bases loaded. The third game, intended for July 17, was postponed because of inclement weather, so the series ended on a doubleheader on July 18. The first game started badly for the Yanks, with Domingo Germán allowing two home runs to start the contest. However, Gio Urshela soon tied the game with a two-run homer of his own, and later added an RBI double in the three-run fifth. In the second inning, manager Aaron Boone got ejected for rebuking young umpire Brennan Miller, screaming, "My guys are fucking savages in that fucking box ... Tighten this shit up!" The Yankees emerged victorious, 6–2. The Yankees took the series in the second header, with a 5–1 win in which Chad Green, Nestor Cortes and Luis Cessa combined to limit the Rays to one run and five hits over  frames.

Yankees won the series 3–1 (23–11 runs)

July 19–21, vs. Colorado Rockies
The Yankees welcomed the Rockies to New York for an interleague series at Yankee Stadium. NY won the first game 8–2 and the second 11–5. In the last game, the Yankees went for the sweep but came up short in an 8–4 loss.

Yankees won the series 2–1 (23–15 runs)

July 22–24, at Minnesota Twins
The Yanks won two out of three games in a series against the Twins at Target Field to claim the fourth series in a row since the All-Star break.

Yankees won the series 2–1 (30–27 runs)

July 25–28, at Boston Red Sox
In their first trip of the season to Fenway Park, the Yankees were heavily defeated by their longtime rivals in three contests in a row, losing the first one 19-3, bouncing back in the last one to avoid the sweep. In all three losses, the Yankees allowed at least 9 runs and never got more than 5 themselves. Nonetheless, the Yankees stayed atop of AL East, 9 games clear of the Red Sox, as the series ended.

Yankees lost the series 1–3 (22–44 runs)

July 30–31, vs. Arizona Diamondbacks
The Yankees split a two-game series against the Diamondbacks at Yankee Stadium, with the D-backs winning the first and the Yankees winning the second and final game, 7–5.

Yankees tied the series 1–1 (9–9 runs)

August
August 2–4, vs. Boston Red Sox
A week after the Yankees' trip to Boston, it was Red Sox's turn to visit The Bronx. The Yankees completed a four-game sweep of the Red Sox for the first time since August 2009, reaching a season high 33 games over .500 while putting their division rivals in jeopardy of missing the postseason.

Yankees won the series 4–0 (26–12 runs)

August 5–7, at Baltimore Orioles
The Yankees completed another sweep against the Orioles at Camden Yards. Three slugfests by the Bombers made them break several home run records in the process. The Yanks started the series by winning their sixth game in a row, 9–6, while setting an MLB record for the most home runs delivered in an away ballpark in a season, at 32. The O's had managed to tie the game in the sixth inning, but Mike Ford hit his first career go-ahead homer in the top eighth to regain the lead, soon after which came Mike Tauchman's second home run of the night. Aroldis Chapman then closed the game with the tying run at the plate. The game was also remarkable because, despite the loss, Baltimore shortstop Jonathan Villar hit for the cycle.

Yankees won the series 3–0 (32–12 runs)

August 8–11, at Toronto Blue Jays
The Yanks and the Jays split a four-game series at Rogers Centre.

Yankees tied the series 2–2 (19–19 runs)

August 12–14, vs. Baltimore Orioles
In their sixth and final encounter of the season, the Yankees swept the Orioles for a fifth time, posting a whopping 17–2 record against their division rivals. The series included a doubleheader on August 12 as a makeup for the game scheduled on May 14, postponed due to inclement weather, resulting in a four-game series. Torres scored a total 13 home runs versus the Orioles, setting a record in the divisional era.

Yankees won the series 4–0 (33–21 runs)

August 15–18, vs. Cleveland Indians
The Yankees and the Indians won two games apiece in a four-game series at Yankee Stadium.

Yankees tied the series 2–2 (18–34 runs)

August 20–22, at Oakland Athletics
The Yankees started a West Coast road trip in bad shape, getting swept by the A's in a three-game series at RingCentral Coliseum.

Yankees lost the series 0–3 (9–17 runs)

August 23–25, at Los Angeles Dodgers
The Yankees and the Dodgers faced each other at Dodger Stadium, in what the media, the fans and many players saw as a possible 2019 World Series matchup preview. The Yankees claimed the series 2–1, something that would give them home-field advantage in the Fall Classic in case both teams finish with the same winning percentage in the regular season. In the third game of the series, a 5–1 win by the New York team, the Yankees homered three times off Clayton Kershaw to set the record for most home runs in a calendar month at 61, surpassing the previous record of 58 owned by the 1987 Baltimore Orioles and the 1999 Seattle Mariners.

Yankees won the series 2–1 (16–5 runs)

August 26–28, at Seattle Mariners
The Yankees swept the Mariners at T-Mobile Park, finishing their road trip with a 5–4 record. The Bombers added more home runs to their record calendar month, going deep a total of 70 times during August still with two games to spare. One of these homers was the 100th of Aaron Judge's career, who became the third fastest player in baseball history to reach the centennial mark, during the 7–0 shutout by Masahiro Tanaka in the second game of the series.

Yankees won the series 3–0 (19–7 runs)

August 30 – September 1, vs. Oakland Athletics
The Yankees hosted the Athletics in a three-game series. After losing the first game, the Yankees bounced back to take the series, thus becoming the first team in the MLB to reach 90 wins. New York needed the extra innings to beat the A's for the first time in the season, 4–3, thanks to a DJ LeMahieu walk-off home run in the eleventh. With the win, the Yankees completed their winningest calendar month since August 2009, while further improving their record of homers in a calendar month to 74. On the next day, with the series at stake, the Yankees stole the game with a walk-off once again. Trailing 4–0 and with six outs left, the Yankees cut their deficit to 4–3 in the bottom eighth, and then Brett Gardner and pinch-hitter Mike Ford back-to-back homered off Liam Hendriks in the ninth to tie the score and win the game, respectively.

Yankees won the series 2–1 (11–15 runs)

September
September 2–4, vs. Texas Rangers
The Yankees faced the Texas Rangers at home, the only American League team they hadn't met yet in the season. In the first game, New York got shut out, 7–0, and their streak of 220 consecutive games getting on the scoreboard came to an end. Steampowered by home runs, the Bombers bounced back to take the next two, claiming the series to remain unbeaten in their last 21 home series (an 18–0–3 record).

Yankees won the series 2–1 (14–9 runs)
 
September 6–9, at Boston Red Sox
The New York Yankees started their last trip of the season to Fenway Park with a loss, but bounced back to take the next three. The last one, a 5–0 shutout, eliminated the Red Sox from division contention and left them virtually out of the wild card race, at 8 games back with less than twenty games to spare. The Yankees finished the season 14–5 against the Red Sox.

Yankees won the series 3–1 (21–12 runs)

September 10–12, at Detroit Tigers
The Yanks continued cruising into their first AL East pennant since 2012 with another series win, against the Tigers, reducing their magic number to 5. In the last game, the second of a doubleheader on September 12, New York previewed what could be one of their postseason strategies: starting CC Sabathia, who struck out five in  innings to surpass John Smoltz on the all-time strikeouts list, and then relieving him with Domingo Germán, who did not allow a run over four frames, in a 6–4 victory. The doubleheader turned out to be costly for the Yankees, as they lost Edwin Encarnación due to a left oblique strain, J. A. Happ due to a left biceps tendinitis, and Gary Sánchez due to a left groin tightness.

Yankees won the series 2–1 (27–20 runs)

September 13–15, at Toronto Blue Jays
At Rogers Centre, the Yankees struggled to win against the Blue Jays, dropping two out of three contests. Nonetheless, the Yanks moved one step closer to clinching the AL East.

Yankees lost the series 1–2 (22–15 runs)

September 17–19, vs. Los Angeles Angels
The Yankees returned home to face the Angels in a three game set, successfully clinching their first AL East title since 2012 with their 100th win of the year. Giancarlo Stanton also returned from injury in the second game of the series.

Yankees won the series 2-1 (19-4 runs)

September 20–22, vs. Toronto Blue Jays
In their final series with the Blue Jays of the year, the Yankees would lose the first game of a three-game series, but go on to win the next two.

Yankees won the series 2-1 (18–9 runs)

September 24–25, at Tampa Bay Rays
The Yankees would face the Rays one last time in Tampa, barring a postseason meeting. The Yankees failed to beat the Rays, losing both games of the two-game series.

Yankees lost the series 0-2 (6-1 runs)

September 27–29, at Texas Rangers
In the final series ever played at Globe Life Park in Arlington, Texas, the Yankees struggled to beat the Rangers. They won the first game of the series in convincing fashion, scoring 14 runs, but dropped the next two, only scoring 5 runs. The Yankees ended their season with a 103-59 record, their best record since their 2009 championship season.

Yankees lost the series 1–2 (22-19 runs)

Transactions
April 19 – The Yankees sign 1B/DH Logan Morrison to a minor league contract. The deal comes with a July 1 opt-out and a $1 multi-million base salary at the MLB level.
April 22 – The Yankees grant Gio González his release. He went 2–1 with a 6.00 ERA in three starts at Scranton/Wilkes-Barre this year.
April 25 – The Yankees acquire OF Cameron Maybin from the Cleveland Indians in exchange for cash considerations.
May 14 – The Yankees acquire 1B/DH Kendrys Morales and cash from the Oakland Athletics in exchange for a PTBNL or cash considerations.
June 15 – The Yankees acquire 1B/DH Edwin Encarnacion from the Seattle Mariners for cash considerations and minor league pitcher Juan Then.
July 31 – The Yankees acquire OF Terrance Gore from the Kansas City Royals for cash considerations. The Yankees also acquire at the trade deadline minor league LHP Alfredo Garcia from the Colorado Rockies in exchange for RHP Joseph Harvey.
August 24 – The Yankees acquire right-handed pitcher Cory Gearrin who they claimed off waivers from the Seattle Mariners.

Season standings

American League East

American League Wild Card

Record against opponents

Roster

Game log

Regular season

|-style="background:#bfb;"
| 1 || March 28 || Orioles || 7–2 || Tanaka (1–0) || Cashner (0–1) || — || Yankee Stadium || 46,928 || 1–0
|-style="background:#fbb
| 2 || March 30 || Orioles || 3–5 || Yacabonis (1–0) || Paxton (0–1) || Wright (1) || Yankee Stadium || 42,203 || 1–1
|-style=background:#fbb
| 3 || March 31 || Orioles || 5–7 || Means (1–0) || Happ (0–1) || Fry (1) || Yankee Stadium || 38,419 || 1–2
|-

|-style=background:#bfb
| 4 || April 1 || Tigers || 3–1 || Germán (1–0) || Ross (0–1) || Chapman (1) || Yankee Stadium || 32,036 || 2–2
|-style=background:#fbb
| 5 || April 2 || Tigers || 1–3 ||Jiménez (1–0) || Chapman (0–1) || Greene (3) || Yankee Stadium || 32,018 || 2–3
|-style=background:#fbb
| 6 || April 3 || Tigers || 1–2 || Farmer (1–0) || Green (0–1) || Greene (4) || Yankee Stadium || 33,038 || 2–4
|-style=background:#bfb
| 7 || April 4 || @ Orioles || 8–4 || Paxton (1–1) || Wright (0–1) || — || Oriole Park at Camden Yards || 44,182 || 3–4
|-style=background:#bfb
| 8 || April 6 || @ Orioles || 6–4 || Ottavino (1–0) || Castro (0–1) || Chapman (2) || Oriole Park at Camden Yards || 27,504 || 4–4
|-style=background:#bfb
| 9 || April 7 || @ Orioles || 15–3 || Germán (2–0) || Hess (1–1) || — || Oriole Park at Camden Yards || 33,102 || 5–4
|-style=background:#fbb
| 10 || April 8 || @ Astros || 3–4 || Pressly (1–0) || Ottavino (1–1) || Osuna (3) || Minute Maid Park || 27,631 || 5–5
|-style=background:#fbb
| 11 || April 9 || @ Astros || 3–6 || Rondón (1–0) || Green (0–2) || Osuna (4) || Minute Maid Park || 31,009 || 5–6
|-style=background:#fbb
| 12 || April 10 || @ Astros || 6–8 || McHugh (2–1) || Paxton (1–2) || Pressly (1) || Minute Maid Park ||27,685 || 5–7
|-style=background:#fbb
| 13 || April 12 || White Sox || 6–9  || Giolito (2–1) || Happ (0–2) || Jones (1) || Yankee Stadium || 40,913 || 5–8
|-style=background:#bfb
| 14 || April 13 || White Sox || 4–0 || Germán (3–0) || Nova (0–2) || — || Yankee Stadium || 41,176 || 6–8
|-style=background:#fbb
| 15 || April 14 || White Sox || 2–5 || Rodón (2–2) || Tanaka (1–1) || Colomé (3) || Yankee Stadium || 40,104 || 6–9
|-style=background:#bfb
| 16 || April 16 || Red Sox || 8–0 || Paxton (2–2) || Sale (0–4) || — || Yankee Stadium || 45,008 || 7–9
|-style=background:#bfb
| 17 || April 17 || Red Sox || 5–3 || Kahnle (1–0) || Workman (0–1) || Chapman (3) || Yankee Stadium || 44,106 || 8–9
|-style=background:#fbb
| 18 || April 18 || Royals || 1–6 || Bailey (2–1) || Germán (3–1) || — || Yankee Stadium || 39,106 || 8–10
|-style=background:#bfb
| 19 || April 19 || Royals || 6–2 || Sabathia (1–0) || Junis (1–2) || — || Yankee Stadium || 39,668 || 9–10
|-style=background:#bfb
| 20 || April 20 || Royals || 9–2 ||Tanaka (2–1) || Fillmyer (0–1) || — || Yankee Stadium || 42,013 || 10–10
|-style=background:#bfb
| 21 || April 21 || Royals || 7–6  || Britton (1–0) || Diekman (0–1) || — || Yankee Stadium || 40,523 || 11–10
|-style=background:#bfb
| 22 || April 22 || @ Angels || 4–3  || Holder (1–0) || Bard (0–1) || — || Angel Stadium || 35,403 || 12–10
|-style=background:#bfb
| 23 || April 23 || @ Angels || 7–5 || Germán (4–1)|| Stratton (0–2) || Britton (1) || Angel Stadium || 38,016 || 13–10
|-style=background:#bfb
| 24 || April 24 || @ Angels || 6–5 || Loáisiga (1–0) || Buttrey (1–1) || Chapman (4) || Angel Stadium || 37,928 || 14–10
|-style=background:#fbb
| 25 || April 25 || @ Angels || 5–11 || Ramirez (1–0)|| Tanaka (2–2) || — || Angel Stadium || 39,584 || 14–11
|-style=background:#bfb
| 26 || April 26 || @ Giants || 7–3 || Paxton (3–2) || Bumgarner (1–4) || — || Oracle Park || 34,950 || 15–11
|-style=background:#bfb
| 27 || April 27 || @ Giants || 6–4 || Happ (1–2)|| Holland (1–4) || Chapman (5) || Oracle Park ||33,971 || 16–11
|-style=background:#bfb
| 28 || April 28 || @ Giants || 11–5 || Germán (5–1) || Rodríguez (3–3) || — || Oracle Park || 34,540 || 17–11
|-style=background:#fbb
| 29 || April 30 || @ Diamondbacks || 1–3 || Greinke (5–1) || Sabathia (1–1) || Holland (6) || Chase Field || 36,352 || 17–12
|-

|-style=background:#fbb
| 30 || May 1 || @ Diamondbacks || 2–3 || Kelly (3–2) || Tanaka (2–3) || Holland (7) || Chase Field || 31,365 || 17–13
|-style=background:#bfb
| 31 || May 3 || Twins || 6–3 || Holder (2–0) || Gibson (2–1) || Chapman (6) || Yankee Stadium || 35,911 || 18–13
|-style=background:#fbb
| 32 || May 4 || Twins || 3–7 ||  Odorizzi (4–2) || Happ (1–3) || — || Yankee Stadium || 43,123 || 18–14
|-style=background:#bfb
| 33 || May 5 || Twins || 4–1  || Germán (6–1) || Pineda (2–3) || Chapman (7) || Yankee Stadium || 38,603 || 19–14
|-style=background:#bfb
| 34 || May 6 || Mariners || 7–3 || Sabathia (2–1) || Hernández (1–3) || — || Yankee Stadium || 37,423 || 20–14
|-style=background:#bfb
| 35 || May 7 || Mariners || 5–4 || Harvey (1–0) || Swarzak (2–2) || — || Yankee Stadium || 36,851 || 21–14
|-style=background:#fbb
| 36 || May 8 || Mariners || 1–10 || Kikuchi (2–1) || Loáisiga (1–1) || — || Yankee Stadium || 38,774 || 21–15
|-style=background:#bfb
| 37 || May 9 || Mariners || 3–1 || Happ (2–3) || Leake (2–4) || Chapman (8) || Yankee Stadium || 37,016 || 22–15
|-style=background:#bfb
| 38 || May 10 || @ Rays || 4–3 || Germán (7–1) || Glasnow (6–1) || Chapman (9) || Tropicana Field || 20,846 || 23–15
|-style=background:#fbb
| 39 || May 11 || @ Rays || 2–7 || Chirinos (5–1) || Holder (2–1) || — || Tropicana Field || 25,025 || 23–16
|-style=background:#bfb
| 40 || May 12 || @ Rays || 7–1 || Tanaka (3–3) || Snell (3–4) || —|| Tropicana Field || 25,025 || 24–16
|-style=background:#bbb
| — || May 13 || Orioles || colspan=7 | Postponed (inclement weather: rain). Makeup date: May 15th (doubleheader)
|-style=background:#bbb
| — || May 14 || Orioles || colspan=7 | Postponed (inclement weather: rain). Makeup date: August 12th (doubleheader)
|-style=background:#bfb
| 41 || May 15 || Orioles || 5–3 || Happ (3–3) || Hess (1–5) || Chapman (10) || Yankee Stadium || — || 25–16
|-style=background:#bfb
| 42 || May 15 || Orioles || 3–1 || Germán (8–1)  || Cashner (4–2) || Chapman (11) || Yankee Stadium || 41,138 || 26–16
|-style=background:#bfb
| 43 || May 17 || Rays || 4–3 || Holder (3–1) || Alvarado (0–3) || — || Yankee Stadium || 41,281 || 27–16
|-style=background:#fbb
| 44 || May 18 || Rays || 1–2  || Wood (1–0) || Cessa (0–1) || Alvarado (5) || Yankee Stadium || 43,079 || 27–17
|-style=background:#bfb
| 45 || May 19 || Rays || 13–5 || Ottavino (2–1) || Castillo (0–3) || Adams (1) || Yankee Stadium || 43,032 || 28–17
|-style=background:#bfb
| 46 || May 20 || @ Orioles || 10–7 || Britton (2–0) ||Givens (0–1) || Chapman (12) || Oriole Park at Camden Yards || 16,457 || 29–17
|-style=background:#bfb
| 47 || May 21 || @ Orioles || 11–4 || Germán (9–1) || Hess (1–6) || Hale (1) || Oriole Park at Camden Yards || 17,389 || 30–17
|-style=background:#bfb
| 48 || May 22 || @ Orioles || 7–5 || Sabathia (3–1) ||Straily (1–4) || Chapman (13) || Oriole Park at Camden Yards || 17,849 || 31–17
|-style=background:#bfb
| 49 || May 23 || @ Orioles || 6–5 || Kahnle (2–0) || Givens (0–2) || Britton (2) || Oriole Park at Camden Yards || 30,624 || 32–17
|-style=background:#bbb
| — || May 24 || @ Royals || colspan=7 | Postponed (inclement weather: rain). Makeup date: May 25th (doubleheader)
|-style=background:#bfb
| 50 || May 25 || @ Royals || 7–3 || Happ (4–3)|| Barlow (1–1)|| || Kauffman Stadium || 25,243 || 33–17
|-style=background:#bfb
| 51 || May 25 || @ Royals || 6–5 || Adams (1–0) || López (0–6) || Chapman (14) || Kauffman Stadium || 18,599 || 34–17
|-style=background:#fbb
| 52 || May 26 || @ Royals || 7–8  || McCarthy (1–1) || Holder (3–2) || — || Kauffman Stadium || 21,499 || 34–18
|-style=background:#bfb
| 53 || May 27 || Padres || 5–2 || Hale (1–0) || Strahm (2–4) || Chapman (15) || Yankee Stadium || 46,254 || 35–18
|-style=background:#fbb
| 54 || May 28 || Padres || 4–5 || Lauer (4–4) || Tanaka (3–4) || Yates (21) || Yankee Stadium || 37,028 || 35–19
|-style=background:#bfb
| 55 || May 29 || Padres || 7–0 || Holder (4–2) || Paddack (4–3) || — || Yankee Stadium || 40,918 || 36–19
|-style=background:#bbb
| — || May 30 || Red Sox || colspan=7 | Postponed (inclement weather: rain). Makeup date: August 3rd (doubleheader)
|-style=background:#bfb
| 56 || May 31 || Red Sox || 4–1 || Happ (5–3) || Sale (1–7) || Chapman (16) || Yankee Stadium || 45,556 || 37–19
|-

|-style=background:#bfb
|  57 || June 1 || Red Sox || 5–3 || Green (1–2) || Porcello (4–5) || Chapman (17)|| Yankee Stadium || 46,307 || 38–19
|-style=background:#fbb 
|  58 || June 2 || Red Sox || 5–8 || Price (3–2) || Sabathia (3–2) || Workman (2) || Yankee Stadium || 40,068 || 38–20
|-style=background:#fbb
| 59 || June 4 || @ Blue Jays || 3–4 || Pannone (2–3) || Tanaka (3–5) || Giles (11) || Rogers Centre || 20,671 || 38–21
|-style=background:#fbb
| 60 || June 5 || @ Blue Jays || 7–11 || Gaviglio (4–1) || Britton (2–1) || — || Rogers Centre || 16,609 || 38–22
|-style=background:#bfb
| 61 || June 6 || @ Blue Jays || 6–2 || Happ (6–3) || Jackson (0–4) || Chapman (18) || Rogers Centre || 25,657 || 39–22
|-style=background:#fbb
| 62 || June 7 || @ Indians || 2–5 || Plesac (1–1) || Germán (9–2) || Hand (19) || Progressive Field || 31,531 || 39–23
|-style=background:#fbb
| 63 || June 8 || @ Indians || 4–8 || Plutko (2–1) || Sabathia (3–3) || — || Progressive Field || 32,329 || 39–24
|-style=background:#bfb
| 64 || June 9 || @ Indians || 7–6  || Chapman (1–1) || Pérez (1–1) || Tarpley (1) || Progressive Field || 29,028 || 40–24
|-style=background:#bbb
| — || June 10 || Mets || colspan=7 | Postponed (inclement weather: rain). Makeup date: June 11 (doubleheader)
|-style=background:#bfb
| 65 || June 11 || Mets || 12–5 || Tanaka (4–5) || Wheeler (5–4) || — || Yankee Stadium || 41,538 || 41–24
|-style=background:#fbb
| 66 || June 11 || Mets || 4–10 || Vargas (3–3) || Paxton (3–3) || — || Yankee Stadium || 44,698 || 41–25
|-style=background:#fbb
| 67 || June 13 || @ White Sox || 4–5 || Marshall (2–0) || Ottavino (2–2) || Bummer (1) || Guaranteed Rate Field || 25,311 || 41–26
|-style=background:#fbb
| 68 || June 14 || @ White Sox || 2–10 || Giolito (10–1) || Sabathia (3–4) || — || Guaranteed Rate Field || 31,438 || 41–27
|-style=background:#bfb
| 69 || June 15 || @ White Sox || 8–4 || Cortes Jr. (1–0) || López (4–7) || — || Guaranteed Rate Field || 36,074 || 42–27
|-style=background:#bfb
| 70 || June 16 || @ White Sox || 10–3 || Paxton (4–3) || Despaigne (0–2) || — || Guaranteed Rate Field || 37,277 || 43–27
|-style=background:#bfb
| 71 || June 17 || Rays || 3–0 || Tanaka (5–5) || Chirinos (7–3) || — || Yankee Stadium || 39,042 || 44–27
|-style=background:#bfb
| 72 || June 18 || Rays || 6–3 || Happ (7–3) || Roe (0–3) || Chapman (19) || Yankee Stadium || 40,479 || 45–27
|-style=background:#bfb
| 73 || June 19 || Rays || 12–1 || Sabathia (4–4) || Snell (4–6) || — || Yankee Stadium || 41,144 || 46–27
|-style=background:#bfb
| 74 || June 20 || Astros || 10–6 || Cortes Jr. (2–0) || Valdez (3–3) || Chapman (20) || Yankee Stadium || 41,030 || 47–27
|-style=background:#bfb
| 75 || June 21 || Astros || 4–1 || Paxton (5–3) || Peacock (6–5) || Chapman (21) || Yankee Stadium || 41,166 || 48–27
|-style=background:#bfb
| 76 || June 22 || Astros || 7–5 || Holder (5–2) || Pressly (1–1) || Britton (3) || Yankee Stadium || 46,034 ||  49–27
|-style=background:#fbb
| 77 || June 23 || Astros || 4–9 || Verlander (10–3) || Happ (7–4) || — || Yankee Stadium || 46,769 || 49–28
|-style=background:#bfb 
| 78 || June 24 || Blue Jays || 10–8 || Sabathia (5–4) || Sanchez (3–4) || Chapman (22) || Yankee Stadium || 37,204 || 50–28
|-style=background:#bfb
| 79 || June 25 || Blue Jays || 4–3 || Cortes Jr. (3–0) || Richard (0–4) || Chapman (23) || Yankee Stadium || 40,119 || 51–28
|-style=background:#bfb
| 80 || June 26 || Blue Jays || 8–7 || Britton (3–1) || Kingham (3–2) || — || Yankee Stadium || 40,578 || 52–28
|-style=background:#bfb
| 81 || June 29 || @ Red Sox || 17–13 || Green (2–2) || Wright (0–1) || — || London Stadium || 59,659 || 53–28
|-style=background:#bfb
| 82 || June 30 || @ Red Sox || 12–8 || Ottavino (3–2) || Walden (6–1) || — || London Stadium || 59,059 || 54–28
|-

|-style=background:#fbb
| 83 || July 2 || @ Mets || 2–4 || Lugo (4–2) || Ottavino (3–3) || Díaz (18) || Citi Field || 42,150 || 54–29
|-style=background:#bfb
| 84 || July 3 || @ Mets || 5–1 || Germán (10–2) || Vargas (3–4) || — || Citi Field || 43,323 || 55–29
|-style=background:#bfb
| 85 || July 4 || @ Rays || 8–4  || Chapman (2–1) || Drake (0–1) || Hale (2) || Tropicana Field || 21,974 || 56–29
|-style=background:#bfb
| 86 || July 5 || @ Rays || 8–4  || Hale (2–0) || Stanek (0–2) || Chapman (24) || Tropicana Field || 22,182 || 57–29
|-style=background:#fbb
| 87 || July 6 || @ Rays || 3–4 || Poche (2–1) || Green (2–3) ||—|| Tropicana Field || 21,477 || 57–30
|-style=background:#fbb
| 88 || July 7 || @ Rays || 1–2 || Morton (10–2) || Paxton (5–4) || Pagán (5) || Tropicana Field || 20,091 || 57–31
|-style=background:#bff
|colspan="10"|90th All-Star Game in Cleveland, Ohio
|-style=background:#bfb
| 89 || July 12 || Blue Jays || 4–0 || Germán (11–2) || Sanchez (3–13) ||—|| Yankee Stadium || 47,162 || 58–31
|-style=background:#fbb
| 90 || July 13 || Blue Jays || 1–2 || Biagini (3–1) || Happ (7–5) || Hudson (2) || Yankee Stadium || 43,742 || 58–32
|-style=background:#bfb
| 91 || July 14 || Blue Jays || 4–2 || Tanaka (6–5) || Stroman (5–10) || Chapman (25) || Yankee Stadium || 42,303 || 59–32
|-style=background:#fbb
| 92 || July 15 || Rays || 4–5 || Kittredge (1–0) || Chapman (2–2) || Drake (1) || Yankee Stadium || 43,173 || 59–33
|-style=background:#bfb
| 93 || July 16 || Rays || 8–3 || Hale (3–0) || Poche (2–3)||—|| Yankee Stadium || 40,401 || 60–33
|-style=background:#bbb
| — || July 17 || Rays || colspan=7 | Postponed (inclement weather: rain). Makeup date: July 18 (doubleheader)
|-style=background:#bfb
| 94 || July 18 || Rays || 6–2 || German (12–2) || Chirinos (8–5) || — || Yankee Stadium || — || 61–33
|-style=background:#bfb
| 95 || July 18 || Rays || 5–1 || Cessa (1–1) || Morton (11–3) || — || Yankee Stadium || 40,504 || 62–33
|-style=background:#bfb
| 96 || July 19 || Rockies || 8–2 || Happ (8–5) || Freeland (2–7) || Tarpley (2) || Yankee Stadium || 44,316 || 63–33
|-style=background:#bfb
| 97 || July 20 || Rockies || 11–5 || Tanaka (7–5) || Senzatela (8–7) || — || Yankee Stadium || 41,499 || 64–33
|-style=background:#fbb
| 98 || July 21 || Rockies || 4–8 || Márquez (9–5) || Paxton (5–5) || — || Yankee Stadium || 41,841 || 64–34
|-style=background:#fbb
| 99 || July 22 || @ Twins || 6–8 || Thorpe (1–1) || Sabathia (5–5) || Rogers (15) || Target Field || 34,627 || 64–35
|-style=background:#bfb
| 100 || July 23 || @ Twins || 14–12  || Chapman (3–2) || Stewart (2–2) || Green (1) || Target Field || 32,470 || 65–35
|-style=background:#bfb
| 101 || July 24 || @ Twins || 10–7 || Cortes Jr. (4–0) || Odorizzi (11–5) || Chapman (26) || Target Field || 40,127 || 66–35
|-style=background:#fbb
| 102 || July 25 || @ Red Sox || 3–19 || Porcello (9–7) || Tanaka (7–6) ||—|| Fenway Park || 37,591 || 66–36
|-style=background:#fbb
| 103 || July 26 || @ Red Sox || 5–10 || Cashner (10–5) || Paxton (5–6) ||—|| Fenway Park || 37,095 || 66–37
|-style=background:#fbb
| 104 || July 27 || @ Red Sox || 5–9 || Rodríguez (13–4) || Sabathia (5–6) || — || Fenway Park || 36,862 || 66–38
|-style=background:#bfb
| 105 || July 28 || @ Red Sox || 9–6 || Germán (13–2) || Sale (5–10) || — || Fenway Park || 37,429 || 67–38
|-style=background:#fbb
| 106 || July 30 || Diamondbacks || 2–4 || Clarke (4–3) || Happ (8–6) || Bradley (1) || Yankee Stadium || 47,281 || 67–39
|-style=background:#bfb
| 107 || July 31 || Diamondbacks || 7–5 || Ottavino (4–3) || Hirano (3–5) || Chapman (27) || Yankee Stadium || 43,979 || 68–39
|-

|-style=background:#bfb
| 108 || August 2 || Red Sox || 4–2 || Paxton (6–6) || Rodríguez (13–5) || Chapman (28) || Yankee Stadium || 46,932 || 69–39
|-style=background:#bfb
| 109 || August 3 || Red Sox || 9–2 || Germán (14–2) || Sale (5–11) ||—|| Yankee Stadium || 46,625 || 70–39
|-style=background:#bfb
| 110 || August 3 || Red Sox || 6–4 || Kahnle (3–0) || Barnes (3–4) || Chapman (29) || Yankee Stadium || 48,101 || 71–39
|-style=background:#bfb
| 111 || August 4 || Red Sox || 7–4 || Happ (9–6) || Price (7–5) || Green (2) || Yankee Stadium || 47,267 || 72–39
|-style=background:#bfb
| 112 || August 5 || @ Orioles || 9–6 || Ottavino (5–3) || Fry (1–4) || Chapman (30) || Oriole Park at Camden Yards || 20,151 || 73–39
|-style=background:#bfb
| 113 || August 6 || @ Orioles || 9–4 || Cortes Jr. (5–0) || Wojciechowski (2–5) || Ottavino (1) || Oriole Park at Camden Yards || 17,201 || 74–39
|-style=background:#bfb
| 114 || August 7 || @ Orioles || 14–2 || Paxton (7–6) || Means (8–7) ||—|| Oriole Park at Camden Yards || 16,299 || 75–39
|-style=background:#bfb
| 115 || August 8 || @ Blue Jays || 12–6 || Germán (15–2) || Pannone (2–5) || Cessa (1) || Rogers Centre || 34,108 || 76–39
|-style=background:#fbb
| 116 || August 9 || @ Blue Jays || 2–8 || Reid-Foley (2–2) || Happ (9–7) ||—|| Rogers Centre || 25,782 || 76–40
|-style=background:#fbb
| 117 || August 10 || @ Blue Jays || 4–5 || Adam (1–0) || Ottavino (5–4) || Law (3) || Rogers Centre || 33,903 || 76–41
|-style=background:#bfb
| 118 || August 11 || @ Blue Jays || 1–0 || Tanaka (8–6) || Thornton (4–8) || Chapman (31) || Rogers Centre || 27,790 || 77–41
|-style=background:#bfb
| 119 || August 12 || Orioles || 8–5 || Paxton (8–6) || Ynoa (1–7) || Chapman (32) || Yankee Stadium || 42,843 || 78–41
|-style=background:#bfb
| 120 || August 12 || Orioles || 11–8 || Mantiply (1–0) || Blach (0–1) || Ottavino (2) || Yankee Stadium || 40,354 || 79–41
|-style=background:#bfb
| 121 || August 13 || Orioles || 8–3 || Germán (16–2) || Means (8–8) ||—|| Yankee Stadium || 41,284 || 80–41
|-style=background:#bfb
| 122 || August 14 || Orioles || 6–5 || Happ (10–7) || Bundy (5–13) || Chapman (33) || Yankee Stadium || 43,909 || 81–41
|-style=background:#fbb
| 123 || August 15 || Indians || 5–19 || Plutko (5–3) || Green (2–4) ||—|| Yankee Stadium || 44,654 || 81–42
|-style=background:#bfb
|  124 || August 16 || Indians || 3–2 || Tanaka (9–6) || Civale (1–2) || Chapman (34) || Yankee Stadium || 45,015 || 82–42
|-style=background:#bfb
| 125|| August 17 || Indians || 6–5 ||Paxton (9–6) || Plesac (6–4) || Chapman (35) || Yankee Stadium || 47,347 || 83–42
|-style=background:#fbb
| 126 || August 18 || Indians || 4–8 || Clevinger (8–2) || Sabathia (5–7) ||—|| Yankee Stadium || 45,682 || 83–43
|-style=background:#fbb
| 127 || August 20 || @ Athletics || 2–6 || Bailey (11–8) || Germán (16–3) ||—|| Oakland–Alameda County Coliseum || 21,471 || 83–44
|-style=background:#fbb
| 128 || August 21 || @ Athletics || 4–6 || Fiers (12–3) || Happ (10–8) || Hendriks (15) || Oakland–Alameda County Coliseum || 22,017 || 83–45
|-style=background:#fbb
| 129 || August 22 || @ Athletics || 3–5 || Roark (8–8) || Tanaka (9–7) || Soria (1) || Oakland–Alameda County Coliseum || 24,758 || 83–46
|-style=background:#bfb
| 130 || August 23 || @ Dodgers || 10–2 || Paxton (10–6) || Ryu (12–4) || — || Dodger Stadium || 53,775 || 84–46
|-style=background:#fbb
| 131 || August 24 || @ Dodgers || 1–2 || Gonsolin (2–1) || Sabathia (5–8) || Jansen (27) || Dodger Stadium || 53,803 || 84–47
|-style=background:#bfb
| 132 || August 25 || @ Dodgers || 5–1 || Germán (17–3) || Kershaw (13–3) ||—|| Dodger Stadium || 53,828 || 85–47
|-style=background:#bfb
| 133 || August 26 || @ Mariners || 5–4 || Happ (11–8) || Milone (3–8) || Chapman (36) || T-Mobile Park || 23,030 || 86–47
|-style=background:#bfb
| 134 || August 27 || @ Mariners || 7–0 || Tanaka (10–7) || Kikuchi (5–9) || — || T-Mobile Park || 23,129 || 87–47
|-style=background:#bfb
| 135 || August 28 || @ Mariners || 7–3 || Paxton (11–6) || Sheffield (0–1) || — || T-Mobile Park || 32,013 || 88–47
|-style=background:#fbb
| 136 || August 30 || Athletics || 2–8 || Anderson (11–9) || Kahnle (3–1) || — || Yankee Stadium || 47,625 || 88–48
|-style=background:#bfb
| 137 || August 31 || Athletics || 4–3  || Gearrin (1–2) || Trivino (4–6) || — || Yankee Stadium || 44,462 || 89–48
|-

|-style=background:#bfb
| 138 || September 1 || Athletics || 5–4 || Ottavino (6–4) || Hendriks (4–2) || — || Yankee Stadium || 42,860 || 90–48
|-style=background:#fbb
| 139 || September 2 || Rangers || 0–7 || Minor (12–8) || Tanaka (10–8) || — || Yankee Stadium || 40,015 || 90–49
|-style=background:#bfb
| 140 || September 3 || Rangers || 10–1 || Paxton (12–6) || Vólquez (0–1) || — || Yankee Stadium || 33,711 || 91–49
|-style=background:#bfb
| 141 || September 4 || Rangers || 4–1 || Cessa (2–1) || Lynn (14–10) || — || Yankee Stadium || 36,082 || 92–49
|-style=background:#fbb
| 142 || September 6 || @ Red Sox || 1–6 || Walden (9–2) || Germán (17–4) || — || Fenway Park || 35,162 || 92–50
|-style=background:#bfb
| 143 || September 7 || @ Red Sox || 5–1 || Happ (12–8) || Weber (2–3) || — || Fenway Park || 36,619 || 93–50
|-style=background:#bfb
| 144 || September 8 || @ Red Sox || 10–5 || Green (3–4) || Porcello (12–12) || — || Fenway Park || 35,681 || 94–50
|-style=background:#bfb
| 145 || September 9 || @ Red Sox || 5–0 || Paxton (13–6) || Rodríguez (17–6) || — || Fenway Park || 35,884 || 95–50
|-style=background:#fbb
| 146 || September 10 || @ Tigers || 11–12 || Jiménez (4–7) || Adams (1–1) || — || Comerica Park || 16,733 || 95–51
|-style=background:#bbb
| — || September 11 || @ Tigers || colspan=7 | Postponed (inclement weather: rain). Makeup date: September 12 (doubleheader)
|-style=background:#bfb
| 147 || September 12 || @ Tigers || 10–4 || Green (4–4) || Boyd (8–11) || — || Comerica Park || — || 96–51
|-style=background:#bfb
| 148 || September 12 || @ Tigers || 6–4 || Germán (18–4) || Turnbull (3–15) || Chapman (37) || Comerica Park || 17,807 || 97–51
|-style=background:#fbb
| 149 || September 13 || @ Blue Jays || 5–6  || Font (4–4) || Lyons (1–2) || — || Rogers Centre || 23,915 || 97–52
|-style=background:#bfb
| 150 || September 14 || @ Blue Jays || 13–3 || Paxton (14–6) || Waguespack (4–5) || — || Rogers Centre || 26,308 || 98–52
|-style=background:#fbb
| 151 || September 15 || @ Blue Jays || 4–6 || Zeuch (1–0) || Cortes Jr. (5–1) || Giles (20) || Rogers Centre || 22,562 || 98–53
|-style=background:#bfb
| 152 || September 17 || Angels || 8–0 || Loáisiga (2–1) || Ramirez (5–4) || — || Yankee Stadium || 41,026 || 99–53
|-style=background:#fbb
| 153 || September 18 || Angels || 2–3 || Bard (2–2) || Ottavino (6–5) || Robles (22) || Yankee Stadium || 38,106 || 99–54
|-style=background:#bfb
| 154 || September 19 || Angels || 9–1 || Tanaka (11–8) || Heaney (4–6) || — || Yankee Stadium || 42,056 || 100–54
|-style=background:#fbb
| 155 || September 20 || Blue Jays || 3–4 || Adam (2–0) || Kahnle (3–2) || Giles (21) || Yankee Stadium || 45,270 || 100–55
|-style=background:#bfb
| 156 || September 21 || Blue Jays || 7–2 || Paxton (15–6) || Zeuch (1–1) || — || Yankee Stadium || 43,602 || 101–55
|-style=background:#bfb
| 157 || September 22 || Blue Jays || 8–3 || Severino (1–0) || Font (4–5) || — || Yankee Stadium || 44,583 || 102–55
|-style=background:#fbb
| 158 || September 24 || @ Rays || 1–2  || Fairbanks (2–3) || Gearrin (1–3) || — || Tropicana Field || 16,669 || 102–56
|-style=background:#fbb
| 159 || September 25 || @ Rays || 0–4 || Morton (16–6) || Loáisiga (2–2) || — || Tropicana Field || 20,390 || 102–57
|-style=background:#bfb
| 160 || September 27 || @ Rangers || 14–7 || Tarpley (1–0) || Palumbo (0–3) || — || Globe Life Park in Arlington || 35,168 || 103–57
|-style=background:#fbb
| 161 || September 28 || @ Rangers || 4–9 || Hernández (2–1) || Severino (1–1) || — || Globe Life Park in Arlington || 42,870 || 103–58
|-style=background:#fbb
| 162 || September 29 || @ Rangers || 1–6 || Lynn (16–11) || Tanaka (11–9) || — || Globe Life Park in Arlington || 47,144 || 103–59 
|-

Postseason

 
|- bgcolor=#ccffcc
| 1 || October 4 || Twins || Yankee Stadium || 10–4 || Kanhle (1–0) || Littell (0–1) || — || 49,233 || 1–0
|- bgcolor=#ccffcc
| 2 || October 5 || Twins || Yankee Stadium || 8–2 || Tanaka (1–0) || Dobnak (0–1) || — || 49,277 || 2–0
|- bgcolor=#ccffcc
| 3 || October 7 || @ Twins || Target Field || 5–1 || Green (1–0) || Odorizzi (0–1) || Chapman (1) || 41,121 || 3–0 

 
|- bgcolor=#ccffcc
| 1 || October 12 || @ Astros || Minute Maid Park || 7–0 || Tanaka (1–0) || Greinke (0–1) || — || 43,311 || 1–0
|- bgcolor=#ffbbbb
| 2 || October 13 || @ Astros || Minute Maid Park || 2–3  || James (1–0) || Happ (0–1) || — || 43,359 || 1–1
|- bgcolor=#ffbbbb
| 3 || October 15 || Astros || Yankee Stadium || 1–4 || Cole (1–0) || Severino (0–1) || Osuna (1) || 48,998 || 1–2
|- bgcolor=#bbbbbb
| — || October 16 || Astros || colspan=7| Postponed (Inclement Weather, makeup date on October 17)
|- bgcolor=#ffbbbb
| 4 || October 17 || Astros || Yankee Stadium || 3–8 || Pressly (1–0) || Tanaka (1–1) || — || 49,067 || 1–3
|- bgcolor=#ccffcc
| 5 || October 18 || Astros || Yankee Stadium || 4–1 || Paxton (1−0) || Verlander (0−1) || Chapman (1) || 48,483 || 2–3
|- bgcolor=#ffbbbb
| 6 || October 19 || @ Astros || Minute Maid Park || 4–6 || Osuna (1–0) || Chapman (0–1) || — || 43,357 || 2–4
|-

Postseason rosters

| style="text-align:left" |
Pitchers: 0 Adam Ottavino 19 Masahiro Tanaka 34 J. A. Happ 40 Luis Severino 43 Jonathan Loáisiga 48 Tommy Kahnle 53 Zack Britton 54 Aroldis Chapman 57 Chad Green 65 James Paxton 70 Tyler Lyons 85 Luis Cessa
Catchers: 24 Gary Sánchez 28 Austin Romine 
Infielders: 14 Tyler Wade 18 Didi Gregorius 25 Gleyber Torres 26 DJ LeMahieu 29 Gio Urshela 45 Luke Voit
Outfielders: 11 Brett Gardner 27 Giancarlo Stanton 38 Cameron Maybin 99 Aaron Judge 
Designated hitters: 30 Edwin Encarnación
|- valign="top"

| style="text-align:left" |
Pitchers: 0 Adam Ottavino 19 Masahiro Tanaka 34 J. A. Happ 40 Luis Severino 43 Jonathan Loáisiga 48 Tommy Kahnle 52 CC Sabathia  53 Zack Britton 54 Aroldis Chapman 57 Chad Green 61 Ben Heller  65 James Paxton 70 Tyler Lyons 85 Luis Cessa
Catchers: 24 Gary Sánchez 28 Austin Romine 
Infielders: 18 Didi Gregorius 25 Gleyber Torres 26 DJ LeMahieu 29 Gio Urshela 
Outfielders: 11 Brett Gardner 27 Giancarlo Stanton 31 Aaron Hicks 38 Cameron Maybin 99 Aaron Judge 
Designated hitters: 30 Edwin Encarnación
|- valign="top"

Honors

All-Stars 
The team delegates for the 2019 All-Star Game were DJ LeMahieu, Gary Sanchez, Gleyber Torres, Masahiro Tanaka and Aroldis Chapman, which represented the team as part of the winning American League team that won in Cleveland 4–3 against the National League. Tanaka and Chapman made history as they were for the first time since the save was officially adopted in the late 60s as the first ever Yankees to get the All-Star Game win and save, respectively (last time this happened was in 1947). While DJ and Gary were voted by the fans, the first under a new voting system that was first implemented that year, Chapman was later appointed as part of the AL bullpen while Tanaka and Torres joined in at the last minute as replacement players.

Farm system

LEAGUE CHAMPIONS: Trenton

Draft

The Yankees owned two first rounds selections of the 2019 MLB draft: the 30th overall pick and a pick from the Competitive Balance Round A (the 38th overall) they acquired from the Cincinnati Reds.

References

External links
2019 New York Yankees at Baseball Reference 
2019 New York Yankees season

New York Yankees seasons
New York Yankees
New York Yankees
2010s in the Bronx
American League East champion seasons